Roland Kaiser (born Ronald Keiler; 10 May 1952) is a German Schlager singer. He is one of the most successful German-speaking Schlager singers.

Keiler was born in West Berlin. He was working as a marketing executive in a car firm where he was discovered by German music producer Gerd Kämpfe. In 1974, he released his first single under the stage name of Roland Kaiser, titled "Was ist wohl aus ihr geworden?", and in 1976 he got his first chart placement with "Frei, das heißt allein", which reached number 14 on the West German top list. 

In 1980, he competed in the West German trial for the Eurovision Song Contest but did not win. In the same year, he had his greatest success on the lists so far with the song "Santa Maria" (by Oliver Onions/Guido & Maurizio De Angelis), which maintained its first place in West Germany for six weeks.

References

External links 

Official website
 
 Discography on hitparade.ch (in German)

Schlager musicians
1952 births
Living people
German male singers
Musicians from Berlin
Recipients of the Cross of the Order of Merit of the Federal Republic of Germany